Murasoli Maran (17 August 1934 – 23 November 2003) was an Indian politician and an important leader of the Dravida Munnetra Kazhagam (DMK) party which was headed by his maternal uncle and mentor, M. Karunanidhi. A Member of Parliament for 36 years, he was made a Union Minister in three separate central governments, in charge of Urban Development in the V.P. Singh government, Industry in the Gowda and Gujral governments, and finally Commerce and Industry under Vajpayee. Apart from being a politician, Maran was a journalist and scriptwriter for films too.

Early life

Murasoli Maran was born on 17 August 1934 was son of Shanmugasundaram and Shanmugasundari, the elder sister of M. Karunanidhi. He was born at Thirukkuvalai Village Thiruvarur in Tamil Nadu. After completing his basic education in his hometown he headed to Madras to get a master's degree in Arts (M.A) from Pachaiyappa's College and Law College, Madras. Before joining politics, Mr. Maran worked as a Journalist and later served as a social worker. Since his student life at Madras he was closely associated with the DMK. On 15 September 1963 he married Mallika and has two sons and a daughter. His younger son Dayanidhi Maran was an MP (Ex-Union Minister) and his elder son Kalanithi Maran heads and owns the popular TV Network Sun TV. His daughter Anbukarasi Maran is a cardiologist.

He was very vocal against Hindi being introduced in Tamil Nadu and for this he was arrested in 1965 during anti-Hindi agitations for his articles. He was detained for a year under Maintenance of Internal Security Act during the emergency.

Career as journalist

Maran edited a daily newspaper in Tamil Murasoli published from Chennai. He was also an editor of The Rising Sun, a weekly in English. He published Kunguman, Muththaram, Vannathirai and Sumangali in Tamil language.

Films
Murasoli Maran provided screen play and dialogues for more than twenty films in Tamil. He has produced five and directed two films in Tamil

The Sangeet Natak Academy conferred the title Kalai-Mamani in 1975. He was awarded the President's Certificate of Merit and Tamil Nadu Government Award for three best feature films.
Writer
Kula Dheivam (1957)
Annaiyin Aanai (1958)
Anbu Engey (1958)
Thalai Koduthaan Thambi (1959)
Sahodhari (1959)
Nalla Theerpu (1959)
Engal Thangam (1970)

Producer
Pillaiyo Pillai (1972)
Marakka Mudiyumaa? (1966)

Director
 Marakka Mudiyumaa?'' (1966)

Positions held
 1967: Elected to Lok Sabha
 1971: Re-elected to Lok Sabha
 1977–1995: Member, Rajya Sabha
 1977–1995: As a Member of Rajya Sabha he was on The Committee on Public Undertakings for three terms as a Member
 1980–1982: Member, General Purposes Committee
 1980–1982 and 1991-1995: Member, Public Accounts Committee
 1982–1983 and 1987-1988: Member, Committee on the Welfare of Scheduled Castes and Scheduled Tribes
 1988–1989: Member, Committee on Subordinate Legislation
 1989-1990: Union Cabinet Minister, Urban Development
 1992–1993: Member, Joint Parliamentary Committee to enquire into irregularities in the securities and banking transactions
 1996: Elected to Lok Sabha (Eleventh) for the third time
 1996-1998: Union Cabinet Minister, Industry
 1998: Elected to Lok Sabha (Twelfth) for the fourth time
 1999: Elected to Lok Sabha (Thirteenth) for the fifth time
 1999-2002: Union Cabinet Minister, Industry

As a Member of Parliament his qualification would read as M.A., M.P. The MA was his Arts degree at the Pachayappas College. The MP signified his being the Member of Parliament.

Death

Murasoli Maran died aged 69 on 23 November 2003 at Apollo Hospital in Chennai. He was in coma for many weeks. Before treatment at Apollo Hospital, on 14 November 2002, he was admitted to the Methodist Hospital in Houston, Texas, for ailments related to heart (Hypertrophic Cardiomyopathy=HTCM=HCM) and kidney. At the time of his death he was a Cabinet Minister, Government of India, without any portfolio. Prime Minister Vajpayee, and an array of leaders attended his funeral in Chennai.

See also
Political Families of India
Political Families of The World

References

External links
 Official biographical sketch in Parliament of India website

1934 births
Dravida Munnetra Kazhagam politicians
2003 deaths
Union Ministers from Tamil Nadu
India MPs 1967–1970
India MPs 1971–1977
India MPs 1996–1997
India MPs 1998–1999
India MPs 1999–2004
Lok Sabha members from Tamil Nadu
Rajya Sabha members from Tamil Nadu
Karunanidhi family
Politicians from Chennai
People from Tiruvarur district
Commerce and Industry Ministers of India